New Democracy is a Serbian political party in Kosovo. It was founded on 11 July 2007 by Branislav Grbić. Its priorities are minority and social rights, economic issues and democratic interests.

References

Political parties established in 2007
Serb political parties in Kosovo